Banghak station is a subway station on Line 1 of the Seoul Metropolitan Subway. It is the closest station to the Dobong-gu District Office in Seoul.

Exit
 Exit 1: Dobong Fire Station, Banghak 1-dong Community Center, Banghak 1-dong Protection Center, Banghak Post Office, Obong Elementary School, Sindobong Market
 Exit 2: Dobong 2-dong Community Center, Dobong-gu Office, Dobong Middle School, Dobong 2-dong Protection Center, Lotte Mart
 Exit 3: Dobong 2-dong Community Center, Dobong Fire Station, Dobong Information Industrial High School, Banghak 1-dong Community Center, Banghak 1-dong Protection Center, Banghak Post Office, Seoul Changdo Elementary School, Changdong Middle School, Changdong High School

References 

Seoul Metropolitan Subway stations
Metro stations in Dobong District
Railway stations opened in 1986